Sushil Kumar Modi (born 5 January 1952) is an Indian politician from the Bharatiya Janata Party who is a Member of Parliament in the Rajya Sabha from Bihar. He is a former Deputy Chief Minister of Bihar as well as the Finance Minister of Bihar from 2005 to 2013 and 2017 to 2020. He is a lifelong member of the Rashtriya Swayamsevak Sangh. He was appointed the Chairman of the Empowered Committee of State Finance Ministers for the Implementation of Goods and Service Tax in July 2011.

Early life and education 
Sushil Modi was born on 5 January 1952 to Moti Lal Modi and Ratna Devi. He attended Patna Science College and graduated with B.Sc. (Hons) Botany degree in 1973. He enrolled in M.Sc. Botany Course at Patna University but left the course midway to join the social movement started by Jai Prakash Narayan.

Modi married Jessie George on 13 August 1986, a Christian Keralite hailing from Mumbai. Modi and Jessy were classmates during their research studies. During this time, they fell in love and decided to get married.

His wife is a professor in a college. The couple has two sons, Utkarsh Tathagat and Akshay Amritanshu.

He belongs to Modh community, a caste categorised as OBC in the Indian system of positive discrimination.

Early political career
Sushil Modi's political career started as a student activist at Patna University. He became the General-Secretary of Patna University Students' Union in 1973, Lalu Prasad Yadav who later came to be his biggest political rival was the President of the Union at the time. In 1974, he became a Member of Bihar Pradesh Chaatra (Student) Sangharsh Samiti which spearheaded the famous Bihar Student's Movement of 1974. 
Modi was arrested five times during JP Movement and the Emergency. He was arrested during the 1974 student movement in Bihar. He challenged the constitutional validity of MISA Act in the Supreme Court of India which resulted in section 9 of the MISA Act being struck down as unconstitutional. He was booked under the MISA and various other acts from 1973 to 1977. During The Emergency, he was arrested on 30 June 1975 and remained in Jail for 19 months continuously.

He was appointed the State Secretary of the Akhil Bharatiya Vidyarthi Parishad after the Emergency. From 1977 to 1986, he held various leadership positions in the ABVP. During his tenure at ABVP he led a movement against the declaration of Urdu as the second language of Bihar and Uttar Pradesh. Concerned about the issue of foreign infiltration from Bangladesh in the bordering districts of Bihar he raised the issue and after Assam, a movement against foreign infiltrators was launched in Bihar under his leadership.

Political career

In 1990, he joined active politics and successfully contested from Patna Central Assembly (now known as Kumhrar (Vidhan Sabha constituency)). He was re-elected in 1995 & 2000. In 1990, he was made the Chief Whip of the BJP Bihar Legislature Party. From 1996 until 2004 he was the Leader of Opposition in the State Assembly. He filed the Public Interest Litigation (PIL) in the Patna High Court against Lalu Prasad Yadav, which was later known as Fodder Scam. He became a member of Lok Sabha in 2004 representing the constituency of Bhagalpur.

Modi was the Minister for Parliamentary Affairs in a short-lived Nitish Kumar government in 2000. He supported the formation of the State of Jharkhand.

In 2005 Bihar election, NDA came to power and Modi was elected the leader of Bihar BJP Legislature Party. He subsequently resigned from the Lok Sabha and took over as the Deputy Chief Minister of Bihar. He was given the Finance Portfolio along with a number of other departments. After NDA victory in 2010 Bihar elections, he continued to be the Deputy Chief Minister of Bihar. Modi did not contest the 2005 and 2010 Bihar Assembly elections to be able to campaign for BJP.

In 2017, Sushil Modi was the main player behind the fall of the JDU-RJD Grand Alliance government in Bihar, with his continuous tirade against RJD chief Lalu Prasad and his family for four months over his alleged benami properties and irregular financial transactions.

Sushil Kumar Modi was Nitish Kumar’s deputy CM for around 11 years and the duo is often referred to as Ram-Laxman ki jodi in the political circles of Bihar.

On 8 December 2020, he was elected unopposed to the Rajya Sabha from Bihar to fill the vacant seat after the demise of Ram Vilas Paswan. He became the only leader from Bihar to have been a member of the Rajya Sabha, Lok Sabha, Bihar Legislative Council and Bihar Legislative Assembly.

Positions held

See also
 List of Finance Ministers of Bihar
 List of Deputy Chief Ministers of Bihar
List of politicians from Bihar

References

External links
 

Deputy Chief Ministers of Bihar
Bharatiya Janata Party politicians from Bihar
India MPs 2004–2009
Politicians from Patna
Members of the Bihar Legislative Council
Finance Ministers of Bihar
1952 births
Living people
Lok Sabha members from Bihar
Leaders of the Opposition in the Bihar Legislative Assembly
Leaders of the Opposition in the Bihar Legislative Council
Bihar MLAs 1990–1995
Bihar MLAs 1995–2000
Bihar MLAs 2000–2005
Bihari politicians
Rajya Sabha members from Bihar